Ladysmith Airport  is an airport serving Ladysmith, a town in the KwaZulu-Natal province in South Africa.

Facilities
NDB is LY397.5 and VOR is LYV116.5.
The airport is now managed by JetVision Airports Pty Ltd,

References

External links
 

Airports in South Africa
Buildings and structures in KwaZulu-Natal
Transport in KwaZulu-Natal
Ladysmith, KwaZulu-Natal